Solebit is a privately held cybersecurity company, with main offices located in the United States and Israel.

Solebit's cloud-based, real-time SaaS platform is focused on zero-day malware and unknown threats. Solebit blocks malicious active content with flow analysis, de-obfuscation and content evaluation.

Solebit’s applications are in use by organizations in such industries as financial services, healthcare, information technology, public sector, and retail and consumer goods.

Company
Solebit was founded in 2014 and maintains headquarters in San Francisco, California, with offices in Tel Aviv, Israel.

Solebit has received funding from venture capital/growth equity firms Glilot Capital Partners and MassMutual Ventures.

In March 2018, Solebit secured $11 million in Series A funding, led by ClearSky Security.

On July 31, 2018, Solebit was acquired by Mimecast for $100 million.

Products
Solebit's core SoleGATE Security Platform is anchored by DvC, a real-time, signature-less engine, which identifies malware threats, regardless of evasion technique, file type, operating system, and client-side application, whether on-premise or in the cloud.

See also 
 Computer Security
 Zero-Day Threats
 Malware Prevention
 Sandbox Alternative

References

External links 
 

Technology companies based in the San Francisco Bay Area
2014 establishments in California